Zavolzhye is a town in Gorodetsky District of Nizhny Novgorod Oblast, Russia, located on the right bank of the Volga River, opposite Gorodets, the administrative centre of the district, and  northwest of Nizhny Novgorod, the administrative center of the oblast. Population:

Etymology
The name of the town literally means "[the lands] beyond the Volga", i.e., on the river's left bank, since "beyond" here is taken relative to the historically more populated right bank of the river. Thus, Zavolzhye—the region in Nizhny Novgorod Oblast—normally refers to its forested and sparsely populated northeastern half. This makes the name of the town of Zavolzhye somewhat confusing for some people in the region, since the city is located on the right side of the river—it is only "beyond the river" with respect to much older Gorodets.

History
It was founded in 1950 as a settlement serving the construction of the Gorky Hydroelectric Station (now Nizhny Novgorod Hydroelectric Station). It was granted town status in 1964.

Administrative and municipal status
Within the framework of administrative divisions, it is incorporated within Gorodetsky District as the town of district significance of Zavolzhye. As a municipal division, the town of district significance of Zavolzhye is incorporated within Gorodetsky Municipal District as Zavolzhye Urban Settlement.

Economy
Major industrial enterprises in the town include:
Zavolzhye Motorni Zavod (Zavolzhye Engine Factory, ZMZ)
Zavolzhsky Plant of crawler tractors (ZZGT)
Yuta, a furniture factory
a woodworking factory
a pharmaceutical packaging glass manufacturing plant, a division of Schott AG (opened in May 2011);
Ryad, a factory for production of extruded polystyrene foam, insulation

Transportation
The town is the terminus of the electric railroad line from Nizhny Novgorod.

Notable People from Zavolzhye
Arina Averina, rhythmic gymnast
Dina Averina, rhythmic gymnast
Irina Belova, rhythmic gymnast

References

Notes

Sources

Cities and towns in Nizhny Novgorod Oblast
Gorodetsky District
Cities and towns built in the Soviet Union
Populated places established in 1950